Paperu, Indonesia,  is a village on the island of Saparua, which is a part of the Ambon island group in the Maluku Islands.

Populated places in Maluku (province)
Central Maluku Regency
Saparua